Tony Ramos an American amateur wrestler retired from competing in the International circuit for the United States.

Early life and education
Of Mexican descent, Ramos was born February 12, 1991, in Chicago, Illinois, to Alfonzo and Debra Ramos. Ramos started wrestling when he was 3 years old so he could wrestle on the same team as his brothers, Frankie and Vince, and they could all be on the same team for one year.

In 6th grade Ramos joined the Martinez Elite wrestling club which is where he met coach Izzy Martinez. Prior to 8th grade Ramos had been living in Johnsburg, IL but his family moved back to Carol Stream where he attended Glenbard North High School. Ramos was a three-time Illinois state champion at Glenbard North, winning his titles at 112 and 125 pounds. Ramos set school records for most takedowns in a career and season, and best season record. He also placed 5th at Junior World Championships.

After completing his storied high school career, Ramos committed to attend the University of Iowa under head coach Tom Brands. While at Iowa Ramos competed at 133 pounds and was a three time All-American.

On July 19, 2014, he married Megan (Eskew) Ramos, whom he met while at the University of Iowa. On April 25, 2015, the couple welcomed their son Anthony Joseph (AJ) Ramos Jr. into the world.

Ramos formerly trained as a member of the Hawkeye Wrestling Club in Iowa City. Ramos was also a member of the Titan Mercury Wrestling Club. In 2016, after defeating Coleman Scott at the US Olympic Team Trials, Ramos moved to Chapel Hill, North Carolina, to train with Scott and Olympic Champion Kenny Monday as a member of the Tar Heel Wrestling Club. He started a website named "Team Ramos", where Ramos provides updates on his life and career.

College career

2010–2011
Ramos started his college career battling for the 133 spot in the Iowa lineup with senior Tyler Clark. Ramos went 6-0 at Carver-Hawkeye Arena, placed 6th at the Midlands championships and eventually won the starting spot. In his first trip to the NCAA tournament Ramos finished one win shy of All-American honors. Ramos also finished 3rd at the Big Ten conference tournament.

2011–2012
Coming back for his sophomore season Ramos saw much improvement as he finished 2nd at the Big Ten conference tournament, and earned his first All-American honors by placing 3rd at the NCAA championships. Ramos led the team in dual wins (17), dual winning percentage (.944), Big Ten duals (7), Big Ten dual winning percentage (.875), and technical falls (7). Big Ten Wrestler of the Week December 6, 2011, and January 10, 2012. He also posted a 9–0 record at Carver-Hawkeye Arena.

2012–2013
Ramos continued his upward trend as a junior again finishing 2nd at the Big Ten conference tournament and also 2nd the NCAA championships losing to four time NCAA champion Logan Stieber of Ohio State in the finals. Ramos led the team with 23 dual wins and was 8-0 in Big Ten conference duals. Earned Big Ten Wrestler of the Week for the third time in his career on February 5, 2013. Ramos finished the year 9-0 at Carver-Hawkeye Arena.

2013–2014
Ramos finished his senior year on top by winning both the Big Ten conference title and NCAA title at 133. He won both matches over Wisconsin's Tyler Graff. Ramos lost two matches on the year, the first to Joe Colon of the University of Northern Iowa at the Midlands championship finals, and to AJ Schopp of Edinboro. 10-0 at home, raising his career record to 34-0 all-time at Carver-Hawkeye Arena, the first wrestler to accomplish the feat since Brent Metcalf. Named Big Ten Wrestler of the Week on January 14, 2014. Ramos was also named University of Iowa male student-athlete of the year.

International career

2014
Ramos originally planned to take a year off between college and International wrestling, but at his wife's suggestion he entered the World Team Trials in Madison, Wisconsin. After winning the challenge tournament over Nico Megaludis of Penn State, Ramos then wrestled Sam Hazewinkel in the finals. The winner having the chance to wrestle for Team USA.

Ramos won a best of three tournament 4-0 and 5-1 to claim the 57 kg spot for Team USA for the World Championships in Tashkent, Uzbekistan.

Ramos then won the Canada Cup on July 5.

In his first match in Tashkent Ramos lost to Bekhbayar Erdenebat (Mongolia), 4-7.

In November Ramos picked up another win over Sam Hazewinkel in a match sponsored by the Global Wrestling Championship.

Ramos also competed in Iran in late November in the World Club Cups where he went 4-1 for Titan Mercury Wrestling Club.

2015
In his first tournament of the year, Ramos went 0-2 at the prestigious Golden Grand Prix Ivan Yarygin 2015. Ramos lost to eventual silver medalist Ismail Musukaev (tech. fall) and in second match Tony lost to Viktor Rassadin of Russia (4-8). The following weekend Ramos got back on track as he won gold in the 57 kg bracket at the Paris Grand Prix. Ramos also debuted in the World rankings at #19.

On April 3, 2015, Tony Ramos took on former Olympic Gold medalist Henry Cejudo at the AGON event: Iowa Against The World in Cedar Rapids, Iowa. There Ramos would rally from an 8-2 deficit to beat the former Olympic champion 12-8 and he won his second Global Wrestling Championship belt. Later that month Ramos competed in his first World Cup where he went 2-2. His two losses were to Yowlys Bonne of Cuba and former World champion Hassan Rahimi of Iran. USA took silver at the event. Ramos went on to win his first USA national title in Las Vegas on May 9, 2015, when he defeated Andrew Hochstrasser 7-3. The win earned him the right to automatically qualify for the 57 kg finals at the World Team Trials. Ramos had also moved to #13 in the World rankings.

2016

In 2016 Ramos was attempting to make his third straight World Team at 57 kg, but was defeated by former teammate Daniel Dennis in two straight matches at the US Olympic Team Trials in Iowa City, Iowa. It was the first ever loss for Ramos in Carver Hawkeye-Arena. Following his loss in the Olympic Trials Ramos decided to leave the Hawkeye Wrestling Club and become an assistant  coach at the University of North Carolina and also became a member of the wrestling club affiliate, the Tar Heel Wrestling Club.

2017

After winning the U.S. Open at 57 kg in April Ramos earned a bye to the finals of the 2017 World Team Trials. It was there he met former Iowa teammate Thomas Gilman in the finals, where he lost in two straight matches.

He retired of the sport at the 2019 US World Team Trials Challenge tournament, after reaching the semifinals.

Post-retirement 
Ramos will make his grappling debut on October 2, 2020, in a superfight against the experienced Nicky Ryan.

References

External links
 Team Ramos
 Tony Ramos' Rokfin Channel

1991 births
University of Iowa alumni
Sportspeople from Illinois
Living people
American male sport wrestlers